The Hungarian Automated Telescope Network (HATNet) project is a network of six small fully automated "HAT" telescopes. The scientific goal of the project is to detect and characterize extrasolar planets using the transit method. This network is used also to find and follow bright variable stars. The network is maintained by the Center for Astrophysics  Harvard & Smithsonian.

The HAT acronym stands for Hungarian-made Automated Telescope, because it was developed by a small group of Hungarians who met through the Hungarian Astronomical Association. The project started in 1999 and has been fully operational since May 2001.

Equipment
The prototype instrument, HAT-1 was built from a 180 mm focal length and 65 mm aperture Nikon telephoto lens and a Kodak KAF-0401E chip of 512 × 768, 9 μm pixels. The test period was from 2000 to 2001 at the  Konkoly Observatory in Budapest.

HAT-1 was transported from Budapest to the Steward Observatory, Kitt Peak, Arizona, USA, in January 2001. The transportation caused serious damage to the equipment.

Later built telescopes use Canon 11 cm diameter f/1.8L lenses for a wide-field of 8°×8°. It is a fully automated instrument with 2K x 2K Charge-coupled device (CCD) sensors. One HAT instrument operates at the Wise Observatory.

HAT is controlled by a single Linux PC without human supervision. Data are stored in a MySQL database.

HAT-South
From 2009, three other locations joined the HATNet with telescopes of completely new design. The telescopes are deployed to Australia, Namibia and Chile. Each system has eight (2*4) joint-mounted, quasi-parallel Takahashi Epsilon (180 mm diameter, f/2.8) astrographs with Apogee 4k*4k CCDs with overlapping fields of view. The processing computers are Xenomai-based industrial PCs with 10 TB of storage.

Participants in the project
HAT-1 was developed during the undergraduate (and also the first year graduate) studies of Gáspár Bakos (Eötvös Loránd University, now at Princeton University) and at Konkoly Observatory (Budapest), under the supervision of  Dr. Géza Kovács. In the development József Lázár, István Papp and Pál Sári also played an important role. 

More than 100 people have contributed altogether to the seventy planet discovery papers published or submitted by the project as of Feb 2020. Gáspár Bakos, István Papp, József Lázár, Pál Sári, have contributed to all of the planet discoveries by HAT. Other participants who have contributed to at least 10 discovery papers include: Joel Hartman (62 papers, Princeton), Robert Noyes (55, CfA), David Latham (44, CfA), Zoltán Csubry (43, Princeton), Kaloyan Penev (43, UT Dallas), Géza Kovács (42, Konkoly Observatory), Guillermo Torres (40, CfA), Geoffrey Marcy (38, UC Berkeley), Gilbert Esquerdo (37, CfA), Waqas Bhatti (34, Princeton), Miguel de Val-Borro (34, Goddard Space Flight Center), Lars Buchhave (33, Niels Bohr Institute), Daniel Bayliss (32, University of Warwick), Dimitar Sasselov (32, CfA), Bence Béky (31, CfA), Andrew Howard (31, Caltech), Debra Fischer (30, Yale University), George Zhou (30, CfA), Néstor Espinoza (29, STSCI), Andrés Jordán (29, Adolfo Ibáñez University), Robert Stefanik (29, CfA), Rafael Brahm (28, Pontifical Catholic University of Chile), Thomas Henning (28, MPIA), Luigi Mancini (28, University of Rome Tor Vergata), Markus Rabus (28, Las Cumbres Observatory), Vincent Suc (28, Pontifical Catholic University of Chile), John Johnson (27, CfA), R. Paul Butler (20, Carnegie Institution for Science), Simona Ciceri (19, MPIA), Brian Schmidt (19, ANU), Joao Bento (17, ANU), Thiam-Guan Tan (17, Perth Exoplanet Survey Telescope), Mark Everett (16, NOAO), Sam Quinn (16, CfA), Avi Shporer (16, MIT), Allyson Bieryla (14, CfA), Bun'ei Sato (14, Tokyo Institute of Technology), B.J. Fulton (12, Caltech), Howard Isaacson (12, UC Berkeley), András Pál (12, CfA), Brigitta Sipőcz (12, University of Hertfordshire), Támás Szkelenár (12), Chris Tinney (12, University of New South Wales), Duncan Wright (11, Australian Astronomical Observatory), Jeffrey Crane (10, Carnegie Institution for Science), Emilio Falco (10, CfA), Paula Sarkis (10, MPIA), and Stephen Shectman (10, Carnegie Institution for Science).

Planets discovered
One-hundred-thirty-four extrasolar planets have been discovered so far by the HAT surveys, including a handful of planets that were independently discovered by other groups as well (particularly the WASP survey). Sixty-three of these were found by the northern HATNet project, and seventy-one by the southern HATSouth project. All have been discovered using the transit method. In addition, a few additional planetary companions to the transiting planets were discovered through radial velocity follow-up observations, including HAT-P-13c, which was the first outer planetary or brown-dwarf companion confirmed with a well-characterised orbit for a system with a transiting planet 

Light green rows indicate that the planet orbits one of the stars in a binary star system.

North

South

See also
 List of extrasolar planets

A subset of HATNet light curves are available at the NASA Exoplanet Archive.

Other extrasolar planet search projects
 Trans-Atlantic Exoplanet Survey or TrES
 SuperWASP or WASP
 XO Telescope or XO
 Kilodegree Extremely Little Telescope or KELT
 Next-Generation Transit Survey or NGTS

Extrasolar planet searching spacecraft
 COROT is a CNES/ESA spacecraft launched in December 2006
 The Kepler Mission is a NASA spacecraft launched in March 2009
 The Transiting Exoplanet Survey Satellite (TESS) is a NASA spacecraft launched in March 2018

References

External links
 The HAT Exoplanet Surveys 
 The HATNet Exoplanet Survey
 The HATSouth Exoplanet Survey
 Hungarian Astronomical Association
 Wise observatory Hungarian-made Automated Telescope
 The Extrasolar Planets Encyclopaedia

Telescopes
Astrometry
Exoplanet search projects by small telescope